Eremophila neglecta is a flowering plant in the figwort family, Scrophulariaceae and is endemic to Australia. It is a shrub which branches from ground level and which has lance-shaped leaves and orange-red flowers. It occurs in South Australia and the Northern Territory.

Description
Many of the branches arise from ground level and are rough due to the presence of raised leaf bases. Young leaves are densely hairy but become glabrous, sticky and shiny as they age.

The sepals are coloured orange to purplish-red, or yellow with a pinkish tinge. The petal tube is orange-red with red petal lobes and the inside of the tube is yellow with fine orange spots. Occasionally the petal tube is pure yellow. The outside of the petal tube and both sides of the lobes are covered with glandular hairs and the inside of the tube is filled with long, soft hairs. The 4 stamens extend beyond the end of the petal tube.

Taxonomy and naming
The species was first formally described in 1914 by John McConnell Black and the description was published in Transansactions and Proceedings of the Royal Society of South Australia. The specific epithet (neglecta) is a Latin word meaning "disregarded" or "overlooked".

Distribution and habitat
Eremophila neglecta occurs in the northern part of South Australia and the southern part of the Northern Territory where it grows in stony clay on rocky hills and plains, usually in mulga woodland.

Conservation
This species is classified as "of least concern" in the Northern Territory.

Uses

Indigenous use
The leaves of this species were used by Aboriginal people in an infusion to promote well-being.

Essential oils
Eremophila neglecta leaves contain serrulatanes which have antimicrobial activity against Mycobacterium species and the naphthoquinone biflorin.

Horticulture
The bright red flowers of this eremophila are especially attractive as well as providing food for nectar-feeding birds. It can be propagated from cuttings with difficulty and most garden specimens have been grafted onto Myoporum rootstock. It grows in a wide variety of soil types but does best in full sun, is very drought tolerant and is only damaged by the most severe frosts.

References

neglecta
Flora of South Australia
Flora of the Northern Territory
Plants described in 1914
Taxa named by John McConnell Black